Pearl City High School is located in Pearl City, in the City and County of Honolulu in the state of Hawaii, USA.

Established in 1971, Pearl City High School is a public, secondary, co-educational, college preparatory high school that is part of the Hawai'i Department of Education, governed by the Board of Education. During the school's first year of operation, only buildings A and B existed. The school has since expanded, with the C to F, K, L and M buildings. Most buildings have three or four floors, making Building F the only single floor building, with two rooms for its natural resources class and weightlifting room. The sculptures Moon Beyond the Fence by Satoru Abe and Kua Kua Lua by Donald M. Page are on the campus.

Pearl City High School earned the maximum accreditation term of six years in 2006 by the Western Association of Schools and Colleges.

Campus
In the 2000 U.S. Census the school was in the Waimalu census designated place, adjacent to the Pearl City CDP. However as of the 2010 U.S. Census it is now in the Pearl City CDP.

Curriculum
As a school under the Hawaii Department of Education, Pearl City High School follows the Hawaii Common Core standards. The school is ranked 7th in the state of Hawaii, and earned a bronze medal in U.S. News & World Reports annual ranking.

Pearl City High School has an AVID program which supports students who intend to go to college. Extra-curricular activities include DECA, Mock Trial, the Math Team, the Robotics team and the Science Olympiad.

Charger Band
Pearl City High School is most noted for its music program, earning its reputation under the direction of the band director Michael Nakasone. The "Charger" Band is currently under the direction of Chadwick Kamei, Christopher Otsuka and Christopher Lopez. During the freshmen band class, many directed studies students sharpen their skills by directing incoming freshmen while the director of bands supervises or finishes work. The choir, piano and Wind II class, or the intermediate class for students who do not make it or want to go into Wind I, is directed by Chris Otsuka, who was a band student in the early 2000s and later a band director at the University of Hawaiʻi at Mānoa. Chris Lopez directs guitar, musical studies and drum line.

The school has a Music Performing Arts Learning Center specially created by the Hawaii Department of Education to increase and broaden the abilities of students who are interested in music and performing arts. Students are eligible to transfer from their school to Pearl City High School if they are active in one of the Learning Center programs.

The Symphonic Winds (formerly known as the Wind Ensemble I) appeared in the prestigious Mid-West Band and Orchestra Clinic in Chicago, Illinois, the ABA-JBA Convention, and the MENC (Music Educators National Convention) in Phoenix, Arizona.

The Symphonic Winds returned from a performance at the 2009 Hamamatsu Wind Band Conference. Under Chadwick Kamei’s direction, the band has worked with guest conductors and musicians including Jerry Junkin, Barry Kopetz, Thomas Leslie, Tad Suzuki, Wataru Hokoyama, Grant Okamura, Thomas Bingham, Todd Yukumoto and Michael Zonshine.

The Charger Marching Band participated in the 2011 London New Year's Day Parade, spending ten days in Paris and London.

In 2013, the Wind I Ensemble performed at Troy University.

Notable alumni
 David Ige, 8th Governor of Hawaii (2014-)
 Jason Scott Lee, actor
 Mark Takai, former member of the United States House of Representatives for Hawaii's 1st district (2015-2016)
 Jordan Ta'amu, former starting quarterback for the Ole Miss Rebels and the St. Louis BattleHawks, current quarterback for the Kansas City Chiefs.
 Kevin Asano, 1988 Olympic Silver Medalist in Judo. San Jose State University and Hawaii sports hall of fame inductee.

References

External links
 

Public high schools in Honolulu County, Hawaii
Educational institutions established in 1971
1971 establishments in Hawaii
Pearl City, Hawaii